Carlos Mauricio Ferro Fernández (born July 5, 1984) is a Mexican television actor and music video director of Mexican origin. He was born in Torreón, Coahuila de Zaragoza. Carlos Ferro is his stage name and registered with the National Association of Actors of Mexico.

Filmography

Television roles

Awards and nominations

Accolades

References

External links 

1984 births
Male actors from Coahuila
Living people
Mexican music video directors
21st-century Mexican male actors